Carabus maurus is a species of beetle from the family Carabidae, found in Near East, and countries like Armenia, Georgia, Iran, Iraq, Israel, Lebanon, Syria, Turkey, Turkmenistan, and on Cyprus. The species are either black or steal coloured.

Subspecies include:
 Carabus maurus maurus
 Carabus maurus osculatii

References

maurus
Beetles described in 1817
Beetles of Asia